Eranhipalam is a suburb of Kozhikode City, in the Kozhikode district of the state of Kerala, South India. It is where the Civil Station and the Passport Office are located. A new bridge is being constructed as part of a major facelift to the area. It is located on Mini Bypass Road. Zonal Office of State Bank of Travancore is situated here. Central Government has sanctioned a Flyover from Calicut Beach and ending at Eranhipalam near Jayasree Group Property under Bharathmala scheme. This Flyover will be passing through Panicker Road.

Etymology
The exact origin of the name Eranchipalam is uncertain. According to some sources the name Eranchipalam means ‘The Bridge near Ilanji tree’ (Mimusops elengi)  as per this source there was a big tree of Ilanji standing near the present day bridge across Canoly canal. Another version is that the former bridge was made with Ilanji timber to connect both sides of Canoly canal.

Location
Eranchipalam lies in the northern part of Calicut Corporation, it is one of the gateway to Calicut city. The major road links to Eranchipalam are SH 54 (connecting Kozhikode –Balussery), National Highway no: 766 (connecting Kozhikode – Mysore Kollegal), Mini Bypass Road connecting Calicut city. West coast canal network of Kerala, Canoly canal connects Eranchipalam to major tourist spots of Sarovarum Bio park, Elathur, and Kallai.

Importance 
Eranchipalam was famous for automobile workshops, spare parts shops and small scale industrial units. The place was the main source of automobile secondary markets of the region. KSRTC regional works shop of Kozhikode is situated in Eranchipalam. Erachipalam was not a primary place of residence in the Calicut city, it was an industrial area mainly for the automobile sector. However, since the arrival of new generation vehicles like Maruti, Tata, Hundai the customers moved to authorized/ dealer workshop and business of small workshops diminished. Still, the place is the major source of automobiles industrial needs of the city.

Now Erachipalam is a thriving residential area of the city. Mega residential projects like Erachipalam Housing colony, Hilite, Alhind Towers makes Eranchipalam a major residential hub of Calicut city.

Eranhipalam was farmland before 1990s. Paul Nagar is one of the oldest missionary establishment in the area. Towards the start of 1995, Calicut development authority started backfilling of water filled fields and constructed low-cost housing projects for the low-income category under a government scheme. The plots were issued to nominated eligible individuals to establish a colony in city limit.
During the period 1998–2005 the area developed drastically in terms of infrastructure like Roads, electricity, water supply, co-operative hospital, ESI and slowly the city developed towards Eranhipalam area. City bus services extended to the locality.
Currently, this is the hot spot of Calicut city with all governmental and commercial establishments including offices, college, hospital, clubs, hotels, restaurants, supermarts, bike and car showrooms and so on... which turns it as a city hub.

The area is located geographically in a hot spot linking main town and tourism spot dream city swapna nagari bio park. The area is still in the beginning stage of tourism development and has immense potential ahead.

Important Landmarks
 Cherukandy Devi Temple, Madhuravanam, Parammel
 Vagbhatananda Gurudevar smaraka vayanasala.
 Kozhikode Dt. Co operative Hospital.
 Malabar Hospital.
 ESI Dispensary, Eranhipalam junction.
 Regional Passport office, Kozhikode.
 Calicut Civil station.
 Employees Provident Fund Regional office.
 Marad Special Court.
 Thayat Devi Temple.
 Pattarveettil Thrikovil Vishnu Temple.
 Malabar eye care.
 Neduppassery Vetaikorumakan Bhagavathy Temple.
 Vadakkillath Sri Paradevatha kshethram.
State Bank of India Eranhipalam
Suburbs of Kozhikode
Kozhikode downtown